Rolando Bojórquez Gutiérrez (12 August 1967 – 8 March 2013) was a Mexican politician from the Institutional Revolutionary Party. From 2009 to 2012 he served as Deputy of the LXI Legislature of the Mexican Congress representing Sinaloa. He previously served as municipal president of Angostura from 2008 to 2009.

References

1967 births
2013 deaths
Politicians from Sinaloa
People from Angostura Municipality, Sinaloa
Institutional Revolutionary Party politicians
Autonomous University of Sinaloa alumni
Municipal presidents in Sinaloa
21st-century Mexican politicians
Deputies of the LXI Legislature of Mexico
Members of the Chamber of Deputies (Mexico) for Sinaloa